Richard Marks (November 10, 1943 – December 31, 2018) was an American film editor with more than 30 editing credits for feature and television films dating from 1972. In an extended, notable collaboration (1983–2010), he edited all of director James L. Brooks' feature films.

Marks was Barry Malkin's assistant editor on The Rain People (1969), which was directed by Francis Ford Coppola early in his career. He then assisted Dede Allen on Alice's Restaurant (1969) and on Little Big Man (1970); he co-edited Serpico (1973) with Allen. Dede Allen was among the most prominent film editors of her generation, and she was known for helping to develop the careers of several younger editors. Roger Crittenden has written that "Perhaps the outstanding graduate of the Dede Allen Academy is Richard Marks."

Marks was nominated for many awards including four Academy Awards (Oscars), three ACE Eddie Awards, three BAFTA Awards, and an Emmy.

Marks was elected to membership in the American Cinema Editors, and in 2013 he received their Career Achievement Award. Apolcalypse Now was listed as the third best-edited film of all time in a 2012 survey of members of the Motion Picture Editors Guild.

Filmography
The director of each film is indicated in parentheses; the filmography is based on the Internet Movie Database listing.
The Rain People (Coppola-1969)
Alice's Restaurant (Penn-1969)
Little Big Man (Penn-1970)
Parades (with Dennis Golub and Robert J. Siegel) (Siegel-1972)
Bang the Drum Slowly (Hancock-1973)
Serpico (with Dede Allen, Ronald Roose, and Angelo Corrao) (Lumet-1973)
Three Tough Guys (with Mario Morra) (Tessari-1974)
The Godfather Part II (with Peter Zinner and Barry Malkin) (Coppola-1974) (nominated for a BAFTA)
Lies My Father Told Me (with Edward Beyer) (Kadár-1975)
The Last Tycoon (Kazan-1976)
Apocalypse Now (with Gerald B. Greenberg, Walter Murch, and Lisa Fruchtman) (Coppola-1979) (nominated for Oscar, BAFTA and Eddie)
The Hand (Stone-1981) 
Pennies from Heaven (Ross-1981)
Max Dugan Returns (Ross-1983)
Terms of Endearment (Brooks-1983) (nominated for Oscar)
The Adventures of Buckaroo Banzai Across the 8th Dimension (Richter-1984)
St. Elmo's Fire (Schumacher-1985)
Pretty in Pink (Deutch-1986)
Broadcast News (Brooks-1987) (nominated for Oscar and Eddie)
Say Anything... (Crowe-1989)
Dick Tracy (Beatty-1990) 
One Good Cop (Gould-1991)
Father of the Bride (Shyer-1991)
A League of Their Own (Marshall-1992)
I'll Do Anything (Brooks-1994)
Assassins (Donner-1995)
Things to Do in Denver When You're Dead (Fleder-1995)
The Crow: City of Angels (Pope-1996)
'Til There Was You (with Joanna Cappuccilli) (Winant-1997)
As Good as It Gets (Brooks-1997) (nominated for Oscar and Eddie)
You've Got Mail (Ephron-1998)
Inspector Gadget (Kellogg-1999)
What Planet Are You From? (Nichols-2000)
Riding in Cars with Boys (with Lawrence Jordan) (Marshall-2001)
Timeline (Donner-2003)
Spanglish (Brooks-2004)
The Holiday (Meyers-2006)
Made of Honor (Weiland-2008)
Julie & Julia (Ephron-2009)
How Do You Know (Brooks-2010)

References

Further reading
 First section of interview posted in five parts.

1943 births
2018 deaths
American film editors
American Cinema Editors
Artists from New York City